Kankabchén may refer to the following places in Mexico:

Hacienda Kancabchén, Yucatán
Hacienda Kancabchén (Halachó), Yucatán
Hacienda Kancabchén (Homún), Yucatán
Hacienda Kancabchén (Motul), Yucatán
Hacienda Kancabchén (Tunkás), Yucatán
Hacienda Kancabchén Ucí, Yucatán
Hacienda Kancabchén de Valencia, Yucatán
Hacienda Kankabchén (Seyé), Yucatán
Hacienda Kankabchén (Tixkokob), Yucatán

See also
 Hacienda Kankabchén (disambiguation)